Edward "Doc" Goldberg was an American jazz bassist. He played in the Glenn Miller Orchestra and the Will Bradley Trio, alongside Freddie Slack on piano and Ray McKinley on drums. Before that, he played in George Hall's orchestra.  He also played bass for George Paxton and His Orchestra.

Bassist and photographer Milt Hinton may also have used the name "Doc Goldberg" as a pseudonym. Goldberg is deceased.

References

External links
Discogs: Doc Goldberg profile

Year of birth missing
Year of death missing
American jazz double-bassists
American male jazz musicians
Glenn Miller Orchestra members
Male double-bassists